{{Infobox handball biography
| name          = Ionuț Ciobanu
| image         = 
| caption       = 
| fullname      = Ionuț Ciobanu
| birth_date    = 
| birth_place   = Bucharest, Romania
| nationality   = Romanian
| height        = 
| position      = Goalkeeper
| currentclub   = CS Minaur Baia Mare 
| clubnumber    =  16
| youthyears1   = 
| years1        = 2005–2010
| clubs1        = Steaua București
| years2        = 2010–2011
| clubs2        = Energia Pandurii Târgu Jiu
| years3        = 2011
| clubs3        = CSM București
| years4        = 2011–2012
| clubs4        = Toledo BM
| years5        = 2012–2014
| clubs5        = HC Odorhei
| years6        = 2014–2016
| clubs6        = Mulhouse HSA
| years7        = 2016–2019
| clubs7        = CSM București
| years8        = 2019–present
| clubs8        = CS Minaur Baia Mare

| first appearance to the National Team = 2002; last appearance = 2016 
2002-2016 | nationalteam1 =   
}}

International honours
EHF Challenge Cup:
Winner: 2019
EHF Cup Winners' Cup:
Semifinalist: 2010
EHF Challenge Cup:
Winner: 2006
Handball World Championship:
2011

References

1984 births
Living people
Sportspeople from Bucharest
Romanian male handball players
CSA Steaua București (handball) players
Expatriate handball players
Romanian expatriate sportspeople in Spain
Romanian expatriate sportspeople in France